Postmedia News is a national news agency with correspondents in Canada, Europe, and the United States and is part of the Canadian newspaper chain owned by Postmedia Network Inc.

History
The newspaper service "Southam Inc" was created in 1904 by William Southam. He had been a delivery boy for The London Free Press, and by 1867 he had become part owner. He bought and transformed the failing Hamilton Spectator in 1877. In 1897 he bought up many other papers including the Calgary Herald, the Ottawa Citizen, Vancouver's The Province and many more. The Winnipeg Tribune was also a Southam owned newspaper until it closed on August 27, 1980.

Southam Newspapers was sold to Hollinger Inc. in 1996. Under Hollinger control, Southam made many acquisitions, including many of the Canadian print media holdings of Thomson Newspapers. On November 15, 2000, the Southam Newspapers company was broken up with the print media holdings and the Southam Newspapers name being sold to Canwest.

Canwest examined ways to integrate many of its smaller market papers into its Global television news division; however, it wasn't to be. On August 9, 2002, Canwest sold many of its smaller market newspapers to a variety of new owners, including Torstar, Transcontinental Media and Osprey Media. In 2003, Southam Newspapers was fully absorbed into Canwest and became Canwest News Service. Canwest News Service began operating in Winnipeg on February 12, 2003, and moved its expanded operations to Ottawa in April 2007.

In July 2010, Canwest's publishing division was spun off into a new company, Postmedia Network (the latter broadcasting division was sold to Shaw Media), led by National Post CEO, Paul Godfrey as a result of bankruptcy, the service subsequently became known as Postmedia News.

In late November 2017, the company announced the planned closure of a series of newspapers and the sale of some to Torstar which will subsequently close many of those since they competed with Torstar newspapers. The Exeter Times-Advocate and the Exeter Weekender will continue to be operated by Post Media, however. The sales to Torstar must first be approved by the Competition Bureau. A few will survive: the St. Catharines Standard, Niagara Falls Review, Welland Tribune and Peterborough Examiner. In total, 36 publications were expected to close, including 34 in Ontario.

Declining ad revenues for print publications was the primary reason for closing the many publications. Postmedia's Paul Godfrey told the Financial Post, "We were once considered the whale in the water. Now we’re the minnow, and the whale is Google and Facebook. ... This is a crisis situation". In a press release he stated that "the continuing costs of producing dozens of small community newspapers in these regions in the face of significantly declining advertising revenues means that most of these operations no longer have viable business models."

Operations
The operations include the Postmedia News wire service as well as an online news component through Canada.com.

The news agency provides news, sports, entertainment, photography, financial and feature information and data to Postmedia Network's Canadian newspapers, online properties and a number of third party clients in Canada and the United States.

Criticism
The Asper-owned Southam newspaper empire faced criticism when it fired Russell Mills as publisher of the Ottawa Citizen, allegedly for criticizing Prime Minister Jean Chrétien, who was a good friend of Izzy Asper.

See also
 Canada (Director of Investigation and Research) v. Southam Inc.

References

External links

Canada.com

Newspaper companies of Canada
News agencies based in Canada